Struthanthus lojae is a species of plant of the genus Struthanthus in the family Loranthaceae  It is endemic to Ecuador.  Its natural habitat is subtropical or tropical moist montane forests.

References

Loranthaceae
Endemic flora of Ecuador
Endangered flora of South America
Taxonomy articles created by Polbot